Kurayli is a rural locality located in Aktobe Region, Kazakhstan.

References

Populated places in Aktobe Region